Petter Lindström (March 1, 1907 – May 24, 2000) was a Swedish-American neurosurgeon known for his marriage to actress Ingrid Bergman, which ended in divorce due to her affair with filmmaker Roberto Rossellini.

Biography
Lindström was born in Stöde.  He earned dental and medical degrees at the Heidelberg University and the Leipzig University.

Lindström met Bergman in Stockholm in 1933.  They married in 1937 and had a daughter Pia.  He moved to the United States, where he earned a medical degree from the University of Rochester in 1943.  He eventually became a U.S. citizen.

In 1950, Lindström's marriage to Bergman ended in divorce due to her bearing Rossellini's illegitimate son, Roberto.

In 1954, Lindström married Agnes Ronavec and they had four children: Karl, Peter, Michael and Brita.

Lindström taught neurosurgery at the University of California, Los Angeles.  He also taught medicine at the University of Pittsburgh and the University of Utah.  From 1955 to 1964 he was chief of neurosurgery at the Veterans Administration Hospital in Salt Lake City, and from 1964 to 1978 he held his own practice in San Francisco.

Lindström died on May 24, 2000, at the age of 93 in Sonoma, California.

References

1907 births
2000 deaths
Swedish neurosurgeons
Swedish emigrants to the United States
Heidelberg University alumni
Leipzig University alumni
University of Rochester alumni
David Geffen School of Medicine at UCLA faculty
University of Pittsburgh faculty
University of Utah faculty
20th-century surgeons